Omanui / McKinnon Pass (previously spelt Mackinnon Pass) is an alpine pass between Mount Hart and Mount Balloon in Fiordland, New Zealand. The pass is the highest point of the famous Milford Track connecting Lake Te Anau and the Clinton River valley with the Arthur River valley and Milford Sound / Piopiotahi.

History

The pass was known to local Māori as Omanui meaning "the great running" or "the great escape".

Europeans did not discover the pass until October 1888 when Quintin McKinnon and Ernest Mitchell made their way over the pass from the Clinton Valley. McKinnon had been commissioned by the chief surveyor of Otago to find a route from Te Anau to Milford Sound. McKinnon and Mitchell spent a month slashing a track through the forest and eventually made their way across the pass to reach the existing track to Sutherland Falls. The McKinnon Memorial, a large cairn, is located at the pass commemorating the traverse of the route by McKinnon.

The pass was known for a number of years as Mackinnon Pass although it later was agreed that the correct spelling was McKinnon. The name was officially changed in July 2022, correcting the spelling and adding the Māori name to form the dual name Omanui / McKinnon Pass.

Today, the pass is crossed by thousands of hikers every year on the Milford Track. There is a day shelter at the top of the pass for hikers to use as a rest point and for use in emergencies.

Views
Although often clouded in, the pass offers spectacular 360-degree views. The pass is on the ridge between the  Mount Balloon to the east and the  Mount Hart to the west.

References

Tourist attractions in Southland, New Zealand
Mountain passes of the Southern Alps
Landforms of Fiordland